The Staircase is a 1998 television film about the story of the spiral staircase, believed by some to be miraculously built, at the Loretto Chapel in Santa Fe, New Mexico. The film stars Barbara Hershey as Mother Madalyn in charge of the chapel and William Petersen as Joad, the traveling carpenter with spiritual talent as well as woodworking skill. It is based on the novel of the same name by Ann Rinaldi.

Plot
The sisters of the legendary Loretto Chapel in Santa Fe, New Mexico, are nearing completion of a chapel, but architect, contractor, and laborers have all omitted stairs to the choir loft. This becomes a source of disagreement and contention between all parties until one day a mysterious drifter, Joad, arrives in town and is hired by the Reverend Mother Madalyn to design and build the staircase.

Cast
 Barbara Hershey as Mother Madalyn
 William Petersen as Joad
 Diane Ladd as Sister Margaret
 Louis Ferreira as Mr. Mouly (as Justin Louis)
 David Clennon as Simon Filger
 Paul Robert Langdon as Paco
 Anthony Ritter as Hernando
 Mark Sivertsen as Mr. Prewitt
 Rodney A. Grant as Geronimo (as Rodney Grant)
 Jane E. Goold as Sister Florian (as Jane Goold)
 Boots Southerland as Deputy Carlson
 Paul Geoffrey as Samuels

References

External links 
 
 
 

1998 television films
1998 films
American television films
1998 drama films
Films about Catholic nuns
Films about Catholicism
Films directed by Karen Arthur
Films scored by David Michael Frank
Films based on American novels
Films shot in New Mexico
Films set in New Mexico